Qalandarabad District is a district (bakhsh) in Fariman County, Razavi Khorasan Province, Iran. At the 2006 census, its population was 22,734, in 5,243 families.  The district has two cities: Qalandarabad and Sefid Sang.  The district has two rural districts (dehestan): Qalandarabad Rural District and Sefid Sang Rural District.

References 

Districts of Razavi Khorasan Province
Fariman County